Twells is a surname, and may refer to:

 Edward Twells (1823–1898), Bishop of Bloemfontein
 Henry Twells (1823–1900), English cleric, hymn writer and poet
 John Twells (1776–1866), English banker
 Leonard Twells (c.1684–1742), English cleric and theological writer
 Philip Twells (1808–1880), British politician.